The Big Question is a five-part science documentary television series broadcast in the United Kingdom on the Five channel, beginning January 2004 and continuing into 2005. In the North American market, it has been re-released on the Discovery Science network. Each half-hour episode is hosted by a renowned authority, and examines the following provocative questions:

 Part 1 – "How Did the Universe Begin?" presented by Stephen Hawking
 Part 2 – "How Did Life Begin?" presented by Harry Kroto
 Part 3 – "Why Are We Here?" presented by Richard Dawkins
 Part 4 – "Why Am I Me?" presented by Susan Greenfield
 Part 5 – "How Will It All End?" presented by Ian Stewart

The series attracted controversy and criticism from creationists, as well as praise from other reviewers.

References

Channel 5 (British TV channel) original programming
2000s British documentary television series
2004 British television series debuts
2005 British television series endings
Documentary television series about science
Documentary television shows about evolution